Bactriola vittulata is a species of beetle in the family Cerambycidae. It was described by Bates in 1885. It is known from Brazil, Bolivia, French Guiana, Panama, Trinidad and Tobago, and Venezuela.

References

Forsteriini
Beetles described in 1885